The Society for Cinema and Media Studies (formerly the Society for Cinema Studies) is an organization of professors and scholars. Its home office is at the University of Oklahoma, but it has members throughout the world.

SCMS holds an annual conference and publishes Cinema Journal, a periodical featuring articles on media from a critical (i.e., not empirical) perspective. This includes, but is not limited to, film studies, television studies, media studies, visual arts, cultural studies, film and media history, and moving image studies.

Its stated goals are:

Along with the University Film and Video Association, it is one of the principal academic organizations for studying media.

History 
SCMS was founded in 1959 as the Society of Cinematologists. It became the Society for Cinema Studies in 1969.

It added "media" to its name in 2002 to account for the work of its members outside of the film studies discipline.

Conference locations 

2021 planned as an online-only conference
2020 Denver (canceled due to the COVID-19 pandemic)
2019 Seattle
2018 Toronto
2017 Chicago
2016 Atlanta
2015 Montreal
2014 Seattle
2013 Chicago
2012 Boston
2011 New Orleans
2010 Los Angeles
2009 Tokyo (canceled due to concerns about containing the H1N1 ["Swine Flu"] virus)
2008 Philadelphia
2007 Chicago
2006 Vancouver
2005 London
2004 Atlanta
2003 Minneapolis
2002 Denver
2001 Washington, DC
2000 Chicago
1999 West Palm Beach
1998 San Diego (La Jolla)
1997 Ottawa

References

External links
 

American film critics associations
University of Oklahoma
Communications and media organizations based in the United States
Non-profit organizations based in the United States